Laia Forcadell Arenas (born June 6, 1982 in Tortosa, Tarragona, Catalonia) is a female Spanish sprinter and hurdler. She won the gold medal for the 400 m hurdles at the 2006 Ibero-American Championships in Ponce, Puerto Rico, and bronze at the 2010 Ibero-American Championships in San Fernando, Cádiz, Spain.

Forcadell represented Spain at the 2008 Summer Olympics in Beijing, where she competed for the women's 400 m hurdles. She ran in the fourth heat against six other athletes, including Poland's Anna Jesień and Czech Republic's Zuzana Hejnová, who were both considered top medal contenders in this event. She finished the race in last place by eighty-eight hundredths of a second (0.88) behind Trinidad and Tobago's Josanne Lucas, with a time of 58.64 seconds. Forcadell failed to advance into the semi-finals, as she placed twenty-sixth overall, and was ranked farther below three mandatory slots for the next round.

Forcadell is a member of ISS L'Hospitalet Track Club in Barcelona, Spain, being coached and trained by Armando Álvarez Anaya.

Competition record

References

External links

NBC 2008 Olympics profile

Spanish female hurdlers
Living people
Olympic athletes of Spain
Athletes (track and field) at the 2008 Summer Olympics
People from Tortosa
Sportspeople from the Province of Tarragona
1982 births
Athletes (track and field) at the 2005 Mediterranean Games
Athletes (track and field) at the 2009 Mediterranean Games
Mediterranean Games competitors for Spain
Athletes from Catalonia
21st-century Spanish women